The Southern Regional Education Board (SREB) is a nonpartisan, nonprofit organization based in Atlanta, Georgia, that works to improve education at every level in its 16 states: Alabama, Arkansas, Delaware, Florida, Georgia, Kentucky, Louisiana, Maryland, Mississippi, North Carolina, Oklahoma, South Carolina, Tennessee, Texas, Virginia and West Virginia. The nation's first regional interstate compact for education, SREB was founded in 1948 by governors and legislators who recognized the link between education and economic vitality.

See also
National Student Exchange
Midwestern Higher Education Compact
New England Board of Higher Education
Western Interstate Commission for Higher Education

References

External links
 SREB home page
 https://www.sreb.org/publication/65-years History

1948 establishments in the United States
Educational organizations based in the United States
Organizations based in Atlanta
Distance education institutions based in the United States
Organizations established in 1948